Baapmanus is an Indian Marathi television daily soap opera that is aired on Zee Yuva. The show stars Ravindra Mankani, Suyash Tilak in lead roles. The show premiered on Zee Yuva on 18 December 2017.

Cast
Ravindra Mankani as Dadasaheb Zujarrao
Suyash Tilak as Surya, Dadasaheb's younger son
Pooja Pawar-Salunkhe as Aaisaheb, Dadasaheb's wife, Chandra, Surya and Radha's mother
Pallavi Patil as Nisha, Ramakantrao's elder daughter
Sangram Samel as Harshawardhan Rajwardhan Sabnis
Shruti Atre as Geeta, Shabbir's daughter, Surya's love interest
Abhijeet Shwetachandra as Chandra, Dadasaheb's elder son, Shilpa's husband, Ira's father
Sanjay Kulkarni as Ramakantrao
Anand Prabhu as Raghuveer
Namrata Awate as Sujata
Amol Deshmukh as Shabir
Jyoti Patil as Shilpa
Maithili Patwardhan as Ira
Ajay Purkar
Abhilasha Patil

Development
Suyash Tilak who portrays the character of Surya in the show had tagged #baapmanus on his Twitter account and had set a trend to tell about the Baapmanus i.e. to post about the great person in each one's life who guides them on right path and later on 24 November 2017 he revealed that Baapmanus was an upcoming serial on Zee Yuva.

References

External links 
 
 Baapmanus at ZEE5

Marathi-language television shows
Zee Yuva original programming
2017 Indian television series debuts
2018 Indian television series endings